Free Dirt Records is an American independent record label and label services company founded in 2006 by John Smith and Erica Haskell that releases folk and roots music. The label's releases have received two Grammy nominations.

History
John Smith met Erica Haskell when Haskell interned at Smithsonian Folkways in 2000. Later while Haskell was attending graduate school in ethnomusicology they collaborated on a box set of spoken word introductions paired with original songs by anarchist folk musician and storyteller Utah Phillips before founding Free Dirt Records in 2006. The label's first official release was by the traditional Bosnian group Mostar Sevdah Reunion. Smith and Haskell ventured to create a label where they could work with young artists making traditionally rooted music and showcase often overlooked material like spoken word. Since 2006, the label has released music by Pokey LaFarge, Anna & Elizabeth, Hackensaw Boys, Julian Lage & Chris Eldridge (Grammy-nominated), Cahalen Morrison, Che Apalache (Grammy-nominated), Dori Freeman, JP Harris, and The Two Man Gentlemen Band. Free Dirt also works with PM Press to co-release spoken word and folk music. Together they've put out lectures by Noam Chomsky and Howard Zinn and music from Chumbawamba, Leon Rosselson and Robb Johnson, among others. Free Dirt also distributes a number of independent roots record labels including Jalopy (Brooklyn), Big Muddy (St. Louis), Hi-Style (Nashville), Mashed Potato (New Orleans), and Gar Hole (Fayetteville). Free Dirt is based in Takoma, Washington, D.C. and currently managed by Jonathan Een Newton.

Roster

See also
 List of record labels

References

External links
 
 Free Dirt Records at Discogs.com

Folk record labels
Bluegrass record labels
American country music record labels
World music record labels
American independent record labels
American record labels
Reissue record labels
Record labels established in 2006
Ethnomusicology
Companies based in Washington, D.C.
Takoma (Washington, D.C.)